In coordination chemistry, a binucleating ligand binds two metals.  Much attention has been directed toward such ligands that hold metals side-by-side, such that the pair of metals can bind substrates cooperatively.

A variety of metalloenzymes feature bimetallic active sites.  Examples include superoxide dismutase, urease, nickel-iron hydrogenase.  Many Non-heme iron proteins have diiron active sites, e.g. ribonucleotide reductase and hemerythrin.

Examples
Usually binucleating ligands feature bridging ligands, such as phenoxide, pyrazolate, or pyrazine, as well as other donor groups that bind to only one of the two metal ions. Some ligands
binucleating ligands are symmetrical, which facilitates the formation of homobimetallic complexes. Other binucleating ligands, where the binding compartments are dissimilar, facilitate the formation of heterobimetallic complexes.

References

Transition metals
Coordination chemistry